Harry Halliday may refer to:
 Harry Halliday (cricketer, born 1920), English cricketer
 Harry Halliday (cricketer, born 1855), New Zealand cricketer